JHU or Johns Hopkins University is an American private research university in Baltimore, Maryland.

JHU may also refer to:
 Jathika Hela Urumaya, a Sri Lankan political party

See also
 Chu (disambiguation)
 Zhu (disambiguation)